Shane Patrick Horgan (born 18 July 1978) is an Irish former rugby union player who played wing or centre for Leinster and Ireland.

Early life
He was born on 18 July 1978 in Bellewstown, County Meath, to an Irish mother, Ursula (née Campbell) from County Kildare whose parents before her originated from Midfield Co. Mayo and a New Zealand father, John. When Horgan was young he played for Boyne RFC. He also played Gaelic football at Minor (U18) level with the Meath county team. He was educated at a boys' Catholic school, St. Mary's Diocesan School in Drogheda, and was active in their rugby team. Horgan joined Lansdowne on leaving school in 1997.

Club career
Horgan made his debut for Leinster in 1998. He played for Leinster 87 times in the Heineken Cup, ranking fifth in career Heineken Cup appearances. He scored 27 tries during his Heineken Cup career, ranking him eighth (as of 22 February, 2023) on the list of most career tries scored in Heineken Cup competition. His most prolific Heineken Cup season was 2004–05, when Horgan was the leading try scorer with eight tries. He was a member of a Leinster backline which included Brian O'Driscoll, Gordon D'Arcy, Denis Hickie, Felipe Contepomi, Isa Nacewa, Rob Kearney and Johnny Sexton.

International career
Horgan made his debut for the Ireland senior side against Scotland in the 2000 Six Nations Championship, scoring a try in the process. In the following game against Italy he scored two tries and added another one against Wales during the tournament. He was selected for the 2005 British & Irish Lions tour to New Zealand. He was used as a substitute during all three tests. After scoring the winning try against England at Twickenham in the 2006 Six Nations Championship to secure the Triple Crown for the second time in three years, he became a new national hero. Horgan added to his following in 2007 when he scored a try against England in Croke Park by executing a Gaelic football style catch from a Ronan O'Gara crossfield kick. Horgan is known by the Irish media and rugby fans as "Shaggy".

Horgan showed a return to something near the levels of performance of his earlier career in early 2011 but injury towards the end of the club season forced him to miss out on the 2011 Rugby World Cup.

On 28 March 2012, Horgan announced his retirement with immediate effect having failed to regain full fitness following surgery on a long-term knee injury.

Honours

Individual
Leinster all time leading try scorer: (69)
Leinster Supporter's Player Player of the Year (1): 2010–11

Leinster
Celtic League (2): 2001–02, 2007–08
Heineken Cup (2): 2008–09, 2010–11

Ireland
Six Nations (1): 2009

Personal life

Horgan has three older sisters Maria, Sharon and Lorraine and one younger brother, Mark.

He is a second cousin of Jockey Leighton Aspell and his brother Paddy.

Horgan studied law at Portobello College and is completing a master's degree at Trinity College Dublin.

He currently works as trainee solicitor at Lee & Thompson in London, as well as regularly appearing on RTÉ Sport as an analyst in their rugby coverage. Since leaving RTE Sport Shane has joined TV3 for the station’s Six Nations coverage presented by Joe Molloy

References

External links
Leinster profile
Ireland profile
2005 Lions squad profile

1978 births
Living people
Irish people of English descent
Irish people of New Zealand descent
Rugby union players from County Meath
Irish rugby union players
Ireland international rugby union players
Lansdowne Football Club players
Leinster Rugby players
Rugby union wings
Gaelic footballers who switched code
Meath Gaelic footballers
British & Irish Lions rugby union players from Ireland